Paray-le-Monial  is a commune in the Saône-et-Loire department in the region of Bourgogne-Franche-Comté in eastern France. Since 2004 is Paray-le-Monial part of the Charolais-Brionnais Country.

It is nicknamed the "city of the Sacred Heart" and its inhabitants are called Parodiens and Parodiennes.

Geography
Paray-le-Monial is located in the southwest of the Saône-et-Loire Département, in the heart of the  Charolais countryside, in a plain bounded by the Brionnais upland, the rivers Loire, l'Arroux and the Bourbince.

The roughly parallel Bourbince River and the canal du Centre traverse the city from the southeast to the northwest.

Among the elements that form the city, as it has developed over its history, are the upland near the Bourbince River, the priory and basilica, a rectangular town center with very dense housing, national highway N79, which crosses the Bourbince River east and west of the town center, a newer part of town located north of the town center, the Bellevue residential area to the southwest, and several suburbs.

History
Paray (Paredum; Parodium) existed before the monks who gave it its surname of Le Monial, for when Count Lambert of Chalon, together with his wife Adelaide and his friend Mayeul de Cluny, founded there in 973 the celebrated Benedictine priory, the borough had already been constituted, with its ædiles and communal privileges. At that time an ancient temple was dedicated to the Mother of God (Charter of Paray). The Cluny monks were, 999–1789, lords of the town.

Population

Main sights

The town is mainly known for its Romanesque church of the Sacré-Coeur ("Sacred Heart") and as a place of pilgrimage. It was built from the 12th century as a small-scale version of the Abbey of Cluny. It was finished in the 14th century, while the cloister dates to the 18th century.

The Hôtel de Ville, in Renaissance style, is also one of the historical monuments.

Another major building in Paray-le-Monial, is Saint Nicolas' tower, built during the 16th century, which hosts different exhibitions but mainly mosaic exhibitions.

Economy
The area's primary industry is agriculture in particular beef cattle farming. The area is known for its charolais cattle.

Notable people
 Saint Claude de la Colombière (1641-1682), Jesuit priest and the confessor of Saint Margaret Mary Alacoque.
 Saint Margaret Mary Alacoque (1647-1690), Visitation nun and mystic who promoted devotion to the Sacred Heart of Jesus.
 Jules Quicherat (1814–1882), historian and archaeologist.
 Léon-Benoît-Charles Thomas (1826-1894), cardinal
 Émile Buisson (1902-1956), gangster
 Jacqueline Maillan (1923–1992), actress
 Gérard Ducarouge (1941-2015), Formula One car designer
 Richard Trivino (born 1977), goalkeeper
 Vincent Clerc (born 1981), rugby union player
 Alexandre Lapandry (born 1989), rugby union player

Twin towns - Sister cities

Paray-le-Monial is twinned with:
 Bethlehem, Palestine
 Bad Dürkheim, Germany
 Payerne, Switzerland
 Wells, United Kingdom

Tourism
In the Southern Bourgogne-Franche-Comté area, you can see :
 The Arboretum de Pézanin, one of the richest forest collection in France,
 The Rock of Solutré,
 The Cluny abbey and its medieval city,
 Mâcon, Charolles, La Clayette...

See also
Communes of the Saône-et-Loire department

References

Sources

External links

 Sanctuary of Paray-le-Monial – Official website

Romanesque architecture in Burgundy
Communes of Saône-et-Loire
Charolais, France